Senator Piper may refer to:

Pat Piper (politician) (1934–2016), Minnesota State Senate
William Piper (1774–1852), Pennsylvania State Senate